The Calcasieu River  is a river on the Gulf Coast in southwestern Louisiana. The name "Calcasieu" comes (via French) from the Indian Atakapa language katkosh, for "eagle", and yok, "to cry".

Course

The Calcasieu rises in Vernon Parish, north of Leesville, and flows initially southeast, passing through the Kisatchie National Forest southwest of Alexandria. It then turns southwest, flowing past Oakdale and Lake Charles, the largest city on the river. The lake, which is referred to by locals as "Big Lake", is connected by a  channel to the gulf on the south end. The lower portion of the river south of Lake Charles is paralleled by a navigable canal which connects to the Gulf Intracoastal Waterway.

History
In the early 19th century, the area of present-day Louisiana and Texas west of the Calcasieu River extending roughly north-south to the Arroyo Hondo in Natchitoches Parish and east of the Sabine River was disputed between the United States and Spain. The dispute arose from differing interpretations of the western boundary of Louisiana under the terms of the Louisiana Purchase. The area became known as Neutral Ground and became a haven for privateers outside the legal jurisdiction of both nations.

During the US Civil War, a naval engagement occurred on May 6, 1864 at Calcasieu Pass, with the Confederates capturing two Union gun boats.

Water quality
Because the river passes through areas intensive in petroleum refining and other industries, petrochemical wastes have been found contaminating the river and estuarine environment along the lower Calcasieu River. A 1993 Condea Vista Chemical Company pipeline spill was reported by the company to have leaked 1.6 million pounds of a highly toxic chemical known as ethylene dichloride. Mother Jones reported the spill as potentially discharging between 19 and 47 million pounds that would have spread throughout parts of the estuary. Sasol Ltd purchased Condea Vista in 2000 inheriting the controversy. The site was designated a "super-fund site" and Sasol has been involved in long term legal battles that have resulted in settlements, fines, and clean up of affected areas. A problem is that the chemical sinks in water and gets covered by deposits of silt. Cleanup would inherently disturb the covered chemical stirring it up causing further ecological damage. The lower end of the estimated spill (19 million tons) would be two times the 1988 US production of ethylene dichloride that was 9,445,000 tons. 1.6 million tons were cleaned up. Any construction might disturb contaminated soil so would have to be constantly monitored.

See also
 List of Louisiana Natural and Scenic Rivers

References

External links

Rivers of Louisiana
Drainage basins of the Gulf of Mexico
Intracoastal Waterway
Lake Charles, Louisiana
Rivers of Vernon Parish, Louisiana
Rivers of Allen Parish, Louisiana
Rivers of Cameron Parish, Louisiana
Rivers of Calcasieu Parish, Louisiana